Ilya Proskuryakov (born February 21, 1987) is a Russian professional goaltender who is currently playing for Traktor Chelyabinsk in the Kontinental Hockey League (KHL).

Playing career 
Ilya Proskuryakov began his professional career in 2003, playing with Metallurg-2 Magnitogorsk of the Russian Hockey First League (Pervaya Liga). At just 18 years of age, Proskuryakov made his debut for parent team Metallurg Magnitogorsk of the Russian Superleague.

Proskuryakov amassed less than 463 minutes within the Superleague over the next four years, but after Metallurg starter Andrei Mezin became injured in 2009, Proskuryakov rocketed up the charts as one of the brightest KHL rookies.

In late January, 2009, Proskuryakov played one of his greatest games yet, earning a 2-0 win for his team, and stopping 26 saves for the shutout. Proskuryakov's night did not end there though as he became the first netminder to score a goal in a KHL game, when he added an empty net goal with 15 seconds left in the game.

Career statistics

Regular season and playoffs

International

Awards and honours

References

External links 
 
 Ilya Proskuryakov's player profile and career stats at Russian Prospects

1987 births
Living people
Admiral Vladivostok players
Chelmet Chelyabinsk players
HC CSKA Moscow players
Dinamo Riga players
Krefeld Pinguine players
HC Lada Togliatti players
Metallurg Magnitogorsk players
Russian ice hockey goaltenders
HC Sochi players
Torpedo Nizhny Novgorod players
Traktor Chelyabinsk players
HC Yugra players
Sportspeople from Surgut